, also known as Anayama Genba Nobukimi (in Chronicle of Lord Nobunaga),  Baisetsu Nobutada or Anayama Baisetsu, was a Japanese samurai. He became famous as one of the "Twenty-Four Generals of Takeda Shingen". He was lord of Yokoyama Castle and govern on Ejiri Castle at Suruga Province

He was the son of Anayama Nobutomo and a nephew of Takeda Shingen, being a son of his elder sister Nanshōin. He was married to his first cousin, Shingen's daughter Kenshōin. He had one son, Anayama Nobukimi, who lived for just fifteen years, 1572 to 1587.

He fought for his uncle at the Battle of Kawanakajima (1561) and the Battle of Mikatagahara (1573).

In 1575. he fought at the Battle of Nagashino. Enticed by Oda Nobunaga during his final invasion of Takeda domain in Shinano, Suruga and Kai, on 1582. 

He defected to the service of Tokugawa Ieyasu and surrendered his castle in Suruga,  aiding him in his campaign against Takeda Katsuyori. Until this treason, he was considered one of the principal pillars of the house of Takeda. 

He was rewarded by Tokugawa with a fief in Shinano Province for his service, but was captured and burned to death by Takeda sympathizers soon afterwards.

References

Further reading
Turnbull, Stephen (1998). The Samurai Sourcebook. London: Cassell & Co.

External links
  "Legendary Takeda's 24 Generals" at Yamanashi-kankou.jp
Samurai Archives
Japonia 

1541 births
1582 deaths
Samurai
Takeda clan
Takeda retainers
Year of birth unknown